Zábřezí-Řečice is a municipality in Trutnov District in the Hradec Králové Region of the Czech Republic. It has about 100 inhabitants.

Administrative parts
The municipality is made up of villages of Zábřezí and Řečice.

References

Villages in Trutnov District